Riveren Station is a pastoral lease that operates as a cattle station in the Northern Territory of Australia.

All of the holdings are situated in the headwaters of the Victoria River. The property shares a boundary with Inverway to the east, Limbunya Station to the north, Birrindudu to the south and the Daguragu Aboriginal Land Trust to the east.

The country is a mix of black soil plains covered with pastures of Mitchell grass, Queensland blue and silky brown top grasses. The red dirt country supports stands of spinifex.

Mick and Georgia Underwood sold the property in a private sale along with Inverway Station in 2013 to the Indonesian company Japfa Santori for an estimated 35 million. The decision came following live export ban on livestock by the Gillard government in 2011. The station had been passed in at auction in 2012 for 19 million.

Terry Underwood wrote about Riveren in her memoirs, In The Middle of Nowhere and Riveren: My home, Our country.

See also
List of ranches and stations

References

Pastoral leases in the Northern Territory
Stations (Australian agriculture)